La Cascada Formation a sedimentary formation near Futaleufú in the western Patagonian Andes of southern Chile. Lithologies vary from sandstone, siltstone and conglomerate. The sediment that now forms the rock deposited during the Oligocene and  Early Miocene epoch in shallow marine environment. The formation contain fossils of bivalves and gastropods. 
 
The formation unconformably overlies sedimentary rock of Jurassic age, Cretaceous sedimentary rocks of Divisadero Group and Cretaceous granite plutons.

Further south in Aysén Region, the Guadal Formation is a geologically equivalent formation.

See also 
 Geology of Chile
 Chaicayán Group
 Ayacara Formation
 Puduhuapi Formation
 Vargas Formation

References 

Geologic formations of Chile
Miocene Series of South America
Oligocene Series of South America
Chattian Stage
Aquitanian (stage)
Burdigalian
Neogene Chile
Paleogene Chile
Sandstone formations
Siltstone formations
Conglomerate formations
Shallow marine deposits
Geology of Los Lagos Region